Diospyros kurzii is a tree in the family Ebenaceae. Twigs dry to black. The tree is named for the German botanist and curator W. S. Kurz. Habitat is lowland forests. D. kurzii is found in the Andaman and Nicobar Islands, Burma, Thailand, Peninsular Malaysia, Borneo, the Philippines and Maluku.

References

kurzii
Plants described in 1873
Flora of the Andaman Islands
Flora of the Nicobar Islands
Trees of Myanmar
Trees of Thailand
Trees of Peninsular Malaysia
Trees of Borneo
Trees of the Philippines
Trees of the Maluku Islands